Audun Grønvold (born 28 February 1976) is a Norwegian freestyle skier. He was born in Hamar. He won the ski cross World Cup in 2007. He represented Norway at the 2010 Winter Olympics in Vancouver, where he won a bronze medal in the men's ski cross.

Grønvold is a former alpine skier, with a third place in downhill as his best World Cup achievement.

References

1976 births
Living people
Norwegian male freestyle skiers
Norwegian male alpine skiers
Olympic freestyle skiers of Norway
Freestyle skiers at the 2010 Winter Olympics
Olympic bronze medalists for Norway
Olympic medalists in freestyle skiing
Medalists at the 2010 Winter Olympics
Sportspeople from Hamar